In the field of database design, a multi-model database is a database management system designed to support multiple data models against a single, integrated backend. In contrast, most database management systems are organized around a single data model that determines how data can be organized, stored, and manipulated. Document, graph, relational, and key–value models are examples of data models that may be supported by a multi-model database.

Background 
The relational data model became popular after its publication by Edgar F. Codd in 1970. Due to increasing requirements for horizontal scalability and fault tolerance, NoSQL databases became prominent after 2009. NoSQL databases use a variety of data models, with document, graph, and key–value models being popular.

A multi-model database is a database that can store, index and query data in more than one model. For some time, databases have primarily supported only one model, such as: relational database, document-oriented database, graph database or triplestore. A database that combines many of these is multi-model.

For some time, it was all but forgotten (or considered irrelevant) that there were any other database models besides relational. The relational model and notion of third normal form were the default standard for all data storage. However, prior to the dominance of relational data modeling, from about 1980 to 2005, the hierarchical database model was commonly used. Since 2000 or 2010, many NoSQL models that are non-relational, including documents, triples, key–value stores and graphs are popular. Arguably, geospatial data, temporal data, and text data are also separate models, though indexed, queryable text data is generally termed a "search engine" rather than a database.

The first time the word "multi-model" has been associated to the databases was on May 30, 2012 in Cologne, Germany, during the Luca Garulli's key note "NoSQL Adoption – What’s the Next Step?". Luca Garulli envisioned the evolution of the 1st generation NoSQL products into new products with more features able to be used by multiple use cases.

The idea of multi-model databases can be traced back to Object–Relational Data Management Systems (ORDBMS) in the early 1990s and in a more broader scope even to federated and integrated DBMSs in the early 1980s. An ORDBMS system manages different types of data such as relational, object, text and spatial by plugging domain specific data types, functions and index implementations into the DBMS kernels. A multi-model database is most directly a response to the "polyglot persistence" approach of knitting together multiple database products, each handing a different model, to achieve a multi-model capability as described by Martin Fowler. This strategy has two major disadvantages: it leads to a significant increase in operational complexity, and there is no support for maintaining data consistency across the separate data stores, so multi-model databases have begun to fill in this gap.

Multi-model databases are intended to offer the data modeling advantages of polyglot persistence, without its disadvantages. Operational complexity, in particular, is reduced through the use of a single data store.

Databases 

Multi-model databases include (in alphabetic order):

 AllegroGraph – document (JSON, JSON-LD), graph
 ArangoDB – document (JSON), graph, key–value
 ArcadeDB – document (JSON), graph, key–value, time-series, SQL, Cypher query language, Gremlin (query language)
 Cosmos DB – document (JSON), graph, key–value, SQL
 Couchbase – document (JSON), key–value, N1QL
 Datastax – key–value, tabular, graph
 EnterpriseDB – document (XML and JSON), key–value
 MarkLogic – document (XML and JSON), graph triplestore, binary, SQL
 Microsoft Azure SQL Database - relational, document (JSON), graph, XML
 Oracle Database – relational, document (JSON and XML), graph triplestore, property graph, key–value, objects
 OrientDB – document (JSON), graph, key–value, reactive, SQL
 PostgreSQL – relational, document (JSON and XML), key–value, graph, arrays, objects
 Redis – key–value, document (JSON), property graph, streaming, time-series
 SAP HANA – relational, document (JSON), graph, streaming
 Virtuoso Universal Server – relational, document (XML), RDF graphs

Benchmarking multi-model databases 
As more and more platforms are proposed to deal with multi-model data, there are a few works on benchmarking multi-model databases.  For instance, Pluciennik, Oliveira, and UniBench reviewed existing multi-model databases and made an evaluation effort towards comparing multi-model databases and other SQL and NoSQL databases respectively. They pointed out that the advantages of multi-model databases over single-model databases are as follows :

Architecture 
The main difference between the available multi-model databases is related to their architectures. Multi-model databases can support different models either within the engine or via different layers on top of the engine. Some products may provide an engine which supports documents and graphs while others provide layers on top of a key-key store. With a layered architecture, each data model is provided via its own component.

User-defined data models 
In addition to offering multiple data models in a single data store, some databases allow developers to easily define custom data models. This capability is enabled by ACID transactions with high performance and scalability. In order for a custom data model to support concurrent updates, the database must be able to synchronize updates across multiple keys. ACID transactions, if they are sufficiently performant,  allow such synchronization. JSON documents, graphs, and relational tables can all be implemented in a manner that inherits the horizontal scalability and fault-tolerance of the underlying data store.

See also 

 Comparison of multi-model databases
 ACID
 Big data
 NoSQL
 Comparison of structured storage software
 Database transaction
 Data analysis
 Distributed database
 Distributed SQL
 Distributed transaction
 Document-oriented database
 Graph database
 Relational model

References

External links 
 Polyglot Persistence
 The 451 Group, "Neither Fish Nor Fowl: The Rise of Multi-Model Databases"
 ODBMS, "On Multi-Model Databases. Interview with Martin Schönert and Frank Celler."
 ODBMS, "Polyglot Persistence or Multiple Data Models?"
 Infoworld, "The Rise of the Multi-Model Database"

Applications of distributed computing
Databases
Data management
Distributed computing architecture
Distributed data stores
NoSQL
Structured storage
Transaction processing
Data analysis
Big data